S. nivea may refer to:
 Symplocos nivea, a plant species endemic to Malaysia
 Syrmoptera nivea, a synonym for Syrmoptera melanomitra

See also 
 Nivea (disambiguation)